Trinity Health is an American not-for-profit Catholic health system operating 92 hospitals in 22 states, including 120 continuing care locations encompassing home care, hospice, PACE and senior living facilities. Based in Livonia, Michigan, Trinity Health employs more than 120,000 people including 5,300 physicians. Sponsored by Catholic Health Ministries, Trinity Health operates facilities in the US states of Alabama, California, Connecticut, Delaware, Florida, Georgia, Idaho, Illinois, Indiana, Iowa, Maine, Maryland, Massachusetts, Michigan, Nebraska, New Jersey, New York, North Carolina, Ohio, Oregon, Pennsylvania and South Dakota.

History
In May 2000, Trinity Health was formed through a merger between Holy Cross Health System in South Bend, Indiana, and Mercy Health Services in Farmington Hills, Michigan. The new organization initially comprised 25 health ministries across seven states—California, Idaho, Indiana, Iowa, Maryland, Michigan, and Ohio—with 45,000 employees and 7,000 physicians. Trinity Health's headquarters were established first in Farmington Hills, Michigan, and later in Novi, Michigan. At the time, Trinity Health was the 10th largest health system in the nation and the fourth largest Catholic health care system in the country, by total number of hospitals and total bed count, respectively. It operated 47 acute-care hospitals, 432 outpatient facilities, 32 long-term care facilities, and numerous home health offices and hospice programs in 10 states.

In 2013, Trinity Health and Catholic Health East merged into a single organization.

It acquired St. Mary's Hospital in Waterbury, Connecticut in 2015.

For 2018, revenue increased to $18.3 billion. Total assets of $26.2 billion were recorded, with operating income of $401.3 million. As of June 30, 2018, it had 94 acute care hospitals, and reached 22 states. In September 2018, Trinity Health formed Trinity Health Mid-Atlantic with three other hospitals.

Divisions
Trinity Health's divisions are:

 Mercy Medical, Daphne, Alabama
Mercy LIFE (Program of All-Inclusive Care for the Elderly)
 Saint Agnes Medical Center, Fresno, California
 Trinity Health Of New England, Connecticut and Massachusetts 
Johnson Memorial Hospital, Stafford Springs, Connecticut
Mount Sinai Rehabilitation Hospital, Hartford, Connecticut
Mercy Medical Center, Springfield, Massachusetts
Saint Francis Hospital & Medical Center, Hartford, Connecticut
Saint Mary's Hospital, Waterbury, Connecticut
 The Mercy Community, West Hartford, Connecticut (senior community)
 Allegany Franciscan Ministries, Palm Harbor, Florida (foundation)
 BayCare Health System, Clearwater, Florida (joint operating agreement with Morton Plant Mease Health Care and South Florida Baptist Hospital. Also includes Winter Haven Hospital and Bartow Regional Medical Center)
St. Anthony's Hospital, St. Petersburg, Florida
St. Joseph's Hospital, Tampa, Florida
 Holy Cross Hospital, Fort Lauderdale, Florida
 St. Mary's Health Care System, Inc., Athens, Georgia
St. Mary's Good Samaritan Hospital, Greensboro, Georgia
St. Mary's Hospital, Athens, Georgia
St. Mary's Sacred Heart Hospital, Lavonia, Georgia
 Saint Joseph's Health System, Atlanta, Georgia
Mercy Care
Emory Saint Joseph's Hospital, Sandy Springs, Georgia (operated by Emory Healthcare)
 Saint Alphonsus Health System, Boise, Idaho
Saint Alphonsus Medical Center - Baker City, Baker City, Oregon
Saint Alphonsus Medical Center - Nampa, Nampa, Idaho
Saint Alphonsus Medical Center - Ontario, Ontario, Oregon
Saint Alphonsus Regional Medical Center, Boise, Idaho
 Loyola Medicine, Maywood, Illinois
Gottlieb Memorial Hospital, Melrose Park, Illinois
Loyola University Medical Center, Maywood, Illinois
MacNeal Hospital, Berwyn, Illinois
 Saint Joseph Health System, Mishawaka, Indiana
Mishawaka Medical Center, Mishawaka, Indiana
Plymouth Medical Center, Plymouth, Indiana 
 MercyOne, Iowa/Nebraska/South Dakota
 Holy Cross Health, Silver Spring, Maryland
Holy Cross Germantown Hospital, Germantown, Maryland
Holy Cross Hospital, Silver Spring, Maryland
 Mercy Health, Grand Rapids, Muskegon, and Lakeshore, Michigan
 Saint Joseph Mercy Health System, Ann Arbor, Michigan
 St. Francis Medical Center, Trenton, New Jersey
Catholic Health, Buffalo, New York
St. Joseph's Health, Syracuse, New York
 St. Peter's Health Partners, Albany, New York
 St. Joseph of the Pines, Southern Pines, North Carolina (senior community)
 Mount Carmel Health System, Columbus, Ohio
 Trinity Health Mid-Atlantic, Pennsylvania
 Pittsburgh Mercy, Pittsburgh, Pennsylvania (behavioral health)

Divestitures

In 2015, Trinity divested three of their financially struggling facilities to for-profit Prime Healthcare Services. This included St. Joseph Mercy Port Huron Hospital in Port Huron, Michigan, which sold September 2015 in a $37.5 million transaction. Mercy Suburban Hospital, East Norriton, Pennsylvania, was sold in March 2015 in a $35 million transaction, and Saint Michael's Medical Center, Newark, New Jersey, was sold to Prime Healthcare in a $62 million bankruptcy sale.

Ethical and religious directives 
As a Catholic health care provider, Trinity Health hospitals follow the Ethical and Religious Directives for Catholic Health Care Services issued by the United States Conference of Catholic Bishops. The directives guide health care facilities in making decisions about care and services in a way that is consistent with Catholic beliefs.

The following religious communities provide healthcare through Trinity Health:
Sisters of the Holy Cross
Sisters of Mercy of the Americas
Mid-Atlantic Community
New York Pennsylvania West Community
Northeast Community
South Central Community
West Midwest Community
Franciscan Sisters of Allegany
Sisters of Providence of Holyoke
Sisters of St. Joseph of St. Augustine, Florida

References

Hospital networks in the United States
Companies based in Oakland County, Michigan
Livonia, Michigan
Hospitals established in 2000
Catholic hospitals in North America
Catholic health care
Medical and health organizations based in Michigan
Catholic hospital networks in the United States